Feadóga Stáin 2 is the second solo album by Irish Traditional whistle virtuoso Mary Bergin.

Tracks
Reels: The Flogging Reel; The Ivy Leaf; Trim The Velvet
Jigs: The Maid On The Green; The Mooncoin Jig
Reels: Eileen Curran; Lomanach Cross; Billy Brocker's, Miss Thorton's Reel
Air: Aisling Gheal
Polkas: Julia Clifford's; Jenny Lind's Polka
Hornpipes: The Humours Of Ballyconnell
Rigaudon Reel: The Cameronion
Reels: Richard Dwyer's; Miss McDonald
Jigs: Sliabh Russell; Kitty's Rambles; Padraig O'Keefe's
Reels: Dulaman Na Binne Bui; A Stor, A Stor, A Ghr, The Blackhaired Lass
Reels: Gus Jordan's; Big Pat's Reel; Sweeny's Dream; Eddie Maloney's
Air: Seolfaimid Araon Na Geanna Romhainn
Reels: The Galtee Rangers; The Gneevgullia Reel; Paddy Kelly's
Hornpipes: O'Callaghan's; Cooley's
Reels: Micho Russell's Reel; The Laurel Tree; The Woman Of The House

Musicians
Mary Bergin : whistle on all
Kathleen Loughnane : harp
Dearbhaill Standún : fiddle
Joe McKenna : uilleann pipes
Antoinette McKenna : harp
Alec Finn : bouzouki, guitar
Johnny McDonagh : bodhrán
Johnny Campbell : bass guitar
Tom Stephens : guitar

References

External links
 Celtic Instruments
 Tin Whistler
[ Allmusic]

Mary Bergin albums
1993 albums